Methylphosphonic acid is an organophosphorus compound with the chemical formula CH3P(O)(OH)2. The phosphorus center is tetrahedral and is bonded to a methyl group, two OH groups and an oxygen. Methylphosphonic acid is a white, non-volatile solid that is poorly soluble in organic solvent but soluble in water and common alcohols.

Preparation
Methylphosphonic acid can be prepared from triethylphosphite by first using a Michaelis-Arbuzov reaction to generate the phosphorus(V) centre:

CH3Cl  +  P(OC2H5)3   →   CH3PO(OC2H5)2 + C2H5Cl

The resulting dialkylphosphonate is then treated with chlorotrimethylsilane before hydrolysis of the siloxyphosphonate to generate the desired product.
CH3PO(OC2H5)2  +  2 Me3SiCl   →   CH3PO(OSiMe3)2  +  2 C2H5Cl

CH3PO(OSiMe3)2 + 2H2O  →   CH3PO(OH)2  +  2 HOSiMe3

The reaction pathway proceeds via the siloxyphosphonate intermediate due to the difficulty in directly hydrolysing dialkylphosphonates.  Katritzky and co-workers published a one-pot synthesis of methylphosphonic acid in 1989.

References

Phosphonic acids
Organic compounds with 1 carbon atom